Emanuel af Geijerstam (10 October 1730 – 24 September 1788) was a Swedish ironmaster and politician.

Born in Uddeholm in Värmland, Sweden on October 10, 1730, to Bengt Gustaf Geijer and Lovisa Sophia Tranæa, Geijer married Sara Helena Piscator in 1753 and had children. He was admitted as a student at Uppsala University in 1749.

Geijerstam served as a director at the Uddeholm Works, a privately held company, from 1753 to 1767, which later developed into the multinational steel producer Uddeholms AB. In 1770, he obtained the Bofors Works from his brother Johan Eberhard Geijer.

Geijerstam lived in Alkvettern Manor located in Bjurtjärn Socken. He received the Royal Order of Vasa and was ennobled in 1773 at Loka Brunn by Gustav III.

References

Citations

Works cited 

 

1730 births
1788 deaths
Swedish landowners
Swedish ironmasters
Emanuel
Swedish people of Austrian descent
Uppsala University alumni
People from Hagfors Municipality
Bofors people
18th-century Swedish businesspeople
18th-century Swedish politicians
Recipients of the Order of Vasa
Swedish untitled nobility